Lafayette is a census-designated place (CDP) between the cities of Roanoke and Christiansburg in eastern Montgomery County, southwest Virginia, United States. The population as of the 2010 Census was 449.  It is located adjacent to Elliston, at the confluence of the North and South Forks of the Roanoke River.

The Lafayette Historic District was listed on the National Register of Historic Places in 1991.

Climate
The climate in this area is characterized by hot, humid summers and generally mild to cool winters.  According to the Köppen Climate Classification system, Lafayette has a humid subtropical climate, abbreviated "Cfa" on climate maps.

References

Census-designated places in Montgomery County, Virginia
Unincorporated communities in Virginia
U.S. Route 11
Census-designated places in Virginia